B. montanus may refer to:
 Batrachylodes montanus, a frog species endemic to Papua New Guinea
 Blennidus montanus, a ground beetle species
 Buthus montanus, a scorpion species found in Spain